The Cape Cod Marathon is run in Falmouth, Massachusetts, on Cape Cod during late October of each year.

Background
From 1978 to 1983, the marathon was run at Otis Air Force Base and Camp Edwards in neighboring Bourne, Massachusetts.  From 1984 the marathon has been held in Falmouth under the auspices of the Falmouth Track Club.

The course of the Cape Cod Marathon is a certified Boston Marathon qualifying event and is sanctioned by USA Track and Field (USATF) New England division.

Runner's World Magazine has named the Cape Cod Marathon one of the ten most scenic marathons in North America.

Course
The course changed in 2019 to be a new faster, flatter, and much more scenic marathon route, which boasts about 23 miles of flatness with inspiring ocean views. It starts and finishes at the same location beside the Falmouth Village Green, which is situated at about an elevation of 20 feet above sea level.  This results in a net elevation gain/loss of zero. The total elevation gain over the entire course is 390 feet.

From the start to about 19.4 miles, you will enjoy a very flat course, with only minor elevation changes.  The only exception to this is a short hill at 3.4 miles that rises to an elevation of about 30 feet. You will encounter this hill again at 14.2 miles as you run back on this out-and-back section of the course.

At 19.4 miles you will be at the highest elevation on the course at about 50 feet.  From there to mile 22, you will run a mixture of flat to rolling hills along the famous Falmouth Road Race course in the reverse direction, passing the iconic Nobska Lighthouse along the way.

At mile 22, you will leave the rolling hills behind you as you enjoy a flat stretch back to the finish line at the Falmouth Village Green and you are done!   

Course Map:
https://capecodmarathon.com/races/cape-cod-marathon/marathon-route-map/

The men's course record is held by Randy Thomas of Medway, Massachusetts: two hours, 17 minutes, 35 seconds (2:17:35) in 1986.  Thomas was a multiple world and American record holder in distance running events.

The women's course record is held by Cathy Schiro, now Cathy Schiro-O'Brien, of Dover, New Hampshire: two hours, 37 minutes, six seconds (2:37:06) in 1987.  Schiro-O'Brien was a marathon runner in the 1992 Summer Olympics.

Sponsorship
The Cape Cod Marathon benefits from many sponsors, most of which are local businesses from Cape Cod, Martha's Vineyard, Nantucket, and the greater area.  Dunkin' Donuts, based in Canton, Massachusetts, has been the titular sponsor in recent runnings.

Cancellation
In 2020, the race was canceled due to the COVID-19 pandemic. In 2021, it was canceled due to the effects of a nor'easter.

References

External links
 www.capecodmarathon.com

Recurring sporting events established in 1978
Marathons in the United States
Massachusetts culture
Tourist attractions in Barnstable County, Massachusetts